Leszek Dobrzyński (born 5 June 1967 in Szczecin) is a Polish politician. He was elected to the Polish Sejm on 25 September 2005 by getting 7136 votes in 41 Szczecin districts. He was a candidate from the Law and Justice list.

See also
Members of Polish Sejm 2005-2007

External links
Leszek Dobrzyński - parliamentary page - includes declarations of interest, voting record, and transcripts of speeches.

1967 births
Living people
Politicians from Szczecin
Law and Justice politicians
Members of the Polish Sejm 2005–2007
Members of the Polish Sejm 2011–2015
Members of the Polish Sejm 2015–2019
Members of the Polish Sejm 2019–2023
Recipients of the Pro Memoria Medal
University of Szczecin alumni